Uku is a village development committee in Darchula District in the Mahakali Zone of western Nepal right bank of Kali river. At the time of the 1991 Nepal census it had a population of 3931. It is a Historical place being an ancient kingdom of kings of Pal dynasty.

Geography

Peoples and Culture

Adjoining Indian Villages

References

External links
 UN map of the municipalities of Darchula District

Populated places in Darchula District
Village development committees (Nepal)